Challhöchi Pass (el. 848 m.) is a mountain pass in the Jura Mountains on the border of the cantons of Basel-Country and Solothurn in Switzerland. The pass road links Eptingen and Ifenthal or Hägendorf.

References 

Challhöchi (848 m), Pass description on quaeldich.ch for bikers
Challhöchi-Pass (Schweiz) mit dem Motorrad, Pass description on motofun.ch for motorbikers
Challhöchi, Pass description on wanderwaeg.ch for hikers
Sperrstelle Challhöchi SO/BL, Description of military use in world war I/II on festung-oberland.ch
Challhöchi 848 m 2781 ft., Pass description on hikr.org for hikers

External links 
 Challhöchi on the official map of the Swiss Confederacy

Mountain passes of the Jura
Mountain passes of Basel-Landschaft
Mountain passes of the canton of Solothurn 
Basel-Landschaft–Solothurn border